The list of Iron Age hoards in Britain comprises significant archaeological hoards of coins, jewellery, precious and scrap metal objects and other valuable items discovered in Great Britain (England, Scotland and Wales) that are associated with the British Iron Age, approximately 8th century BC to the 1st century AD.  It includes both hoards that were buried with the intention of retrieval at a later date (personal hoards, founder's hoards, merchant's hoards, and hoards of loot), and also hoards of votive offerings which were not intended to be recovered at a later date, but excludes grave goods and single items found in isolation.  Hoards of Celtic coins dating from the time of the Roman occupation of Britain are also included here.

List of hoards

See also

 List of hoards in Britain
 List of Bronze Age hoards in Britain
 List of Roman hoards in Britain

Notes

Footnotes

References
 
 
 
 
 
 
 
 

Archaeology-related lists
Iron Age Britain
Treasure troves
United Kingdom history-related lists
Lists of hoards in Britain